Donnington Wood is part of the new town of Telford in the borough of Telford and Wrekin and ceremonial county of Shropshire, England.

Jockey Sir Gordon Richards was born in Donnington Wood at Ivy Row, part of a new demolished row of cottages on whose site are the apartment blocks 'Gordon House' and 'Richards House'. A local pub in nearby Donnington was named after him: "The Champion Jockey".  This was replaced firstly by a Netto supermarket which itself in 2011 became a Morrisons' supermarket, which then turned into a Home Bargains shop in 2015.

References

Telford